Federal Government College, Wukari is a high coeducational school for both mixed genders. It is located at Wukari Taraba, Nigeria.

It was established along with 109 federal own secondary school as one among the unity schools in Various states of the federation. The school was open in October 1978 at Wukari, Zaki Bam, a temporary place before locating to the main site in 1980. 

The first Principal was Mr. S.N. Abia.

Notes 

Educational institutions established in 1978
1978 establishments in Nigeria

External links 
school website